Head of Bhairava is a mask belonging to Nepal’s Malla period. The sculpture, found in the Kathmandu valley, Nepal was created in the 16th century AD. This mask is made of gilt copper with rock crystal and paint. Bhairava is a terrifying manifestation of Hindu god Shiva. Bhairava is considered as a destructive emanation in Hindu mythology. The Bhairava concept can be seen in not only Hinduism, but also in some Buddhist schools and Jainism. This Bhairava head is ornamented with a diadem entwined with snakes and skulls. It symbolizes rage.

Description
Bhairava is believed to have nine faces and thirty four hands and appears as a black naked figure. Literally, Bhairava means ferociousness or terror. He is depicted as a terrifying god in Hinduism. Bhairava is considered as a manifestation of Shiva. Legends describe that the origin of Bhairava took place due to a struggle between Vishnu and Brahma. Brahma and Vishnu engaged in a struggle about the supreme deity of universe. Brahma considered himself as the supreme deity as he had five heads like Shiva. Shiva in a rage threw a nail of his finger and it turned to Kāla Bhairava. Kāla Bhairava cut off one head of Brahma. Then Brahma realized his fault. Kāla Bhairava is depicted holding Brahma's head ("Brahma kapāla").

Newar people in Nepal have worshipped Bhairava as an important deity. It can be assumed by the surviving Bhairava temples in Nepal. This mask depicting Bhairava is belonging to Nepal’s Malla period. It was found in the Kathmandu valley, Nepal. This mask like head was given to Metropolitan Museum of Art by the Zimmerman family, in 2012. The earrings of the head are shaped like entwined serpents. The mask bears comparison to an inscribed example belonging to 1560. So the item is dated to the 16th century. Originally the mask found its right ear missing, and its attribute, a large copper pendant earring for the left ear, was used as a substitute.

See also
 Bhairava

References

External links 
 Himalayan Region 1,400–1600 AD - Metropolitan Museum of Art

Nepalese culture
Shiva in art
History of Nepal
Sculptures of the Metropolitan Museum of Art
Nepalese sculpture
16th century in Nepal